Stephanie Schmitt-Grohé is a German economist who currently works as a professor of economics at Columbia University. Schmitt-Grohé's research has been focused on macroeconomics as well as fiscal and monetary policy in open and closed economies. In 2004 she was awarded the Bernacer prize, for her research of monetary stabilization policies.

Biography 
Schmitt-Grohé completed her Vordiplom in Economics from the University of Münster in 1987, an MBA in Finance from Baruch College, CUNY in 1989 and received a Ph.D. in economics from The University of Chicago in 1994. At the University of Chicago her doctoral adviser was Michael Dean Woodford, a developer of one of the first microfounded New Keynesian Macroeconomic Models. Upon graduation, Schmitt-Grohé worked from 1994 to 1998 as an economist in the division of Monetary Affairs for the Federal Reserve Board of Governors, afterwards she joined the Department of Economics at Rutgers University, first as an assistant professor from 1998 to 2001, and later as associate professor from 2001 to 2003. After leaving Rutgers in 2003, she worked as a professor in the Department of Economics at Duke University, until 2008 when she began work as a professor in the Department of Economics at Columbia University. In addition to her academic positions, she holds numerous professional affiliations, including research fellow in the International Macroeconomics Programme at The Center for Economic Policy Research; research fellow at The National Bureau of Economic Research in both the Economic Fluctuations and Growth Program, as well as the International Finance and Macroeconomics Program.

Research 
Schmitt-Grohé has stated that much of her early work was motivated by the emergence of the New Keynesian paradigm in macroeconomics at the time. The assumption of imperfect competition and its effects on nominal and real distortions in the New Keynesian economic framework had given way to new ideas and research of stabilization policies. Schmitt-Grohé's scholarship in the area has been multifaceted, and includes, developing tools intended to assist with the rigors of developing these new models, evaluating existing modeling of fiscal and monetary stabilization policies, and developing stabilization policies under various distortionary assumptions. On top of her contributions to macroeconomic modelling, Schmitt-Grohé has dedicated research to discussions on contemporary issues, including, inflation targeting in the post-recession Eurozone and the debate on targeting inflation below zero. As of April 2019 Schmitt-Grohé's research ranks among the top 5% of economists registered with RePEc.

Research on stabilization policy 
A series of publications by Schmitt-Grohé, Jess Benhabib and Martín Uribe between 2001 and 2002 seek to address what they considered a gap in the current literature on stabilization policy. Citing that the current research on monetary policy regimes with interest rate feedback rules lacked in that they only considered local dynamics, meaning small fluctuations around the proposed equilibrium, and that they do not take into account the zero lower bound on nominal interest rates. These simplifications had thus far lead to a single, unique steady state equilibrium, near the targeted inflation rate. Schmitt-Grohé's research deviated mainly in its loosening of these local dynamics and its consideration of a zero lower bound on nominal interest rates. The results of their study confirmed the existence of multiple equilibria; one near the targeted inflation rate as was previously identified; as well as a second equilibrium with zero nominal interest rates and low inflation to mild deflation. This research has taken on importance in the post financial crisis discourse regarding the presence of a liquidity trap and the subsequent historically low interest rates.

Currency pegs 
In a 2012 paper, Stephanie Schmitt-Grohé and Martín Uribe explore the various issues arising from the system of smaller economies using currency pegs, an exchange rate policy where the smaller country's relative exchange rate is fixed to that of a larger economy. The issues cited arise due to the presence of external shocks, such as a fall in the terms of trade or steep hikes in interest rate premiums which lead to a decrease in aggregate demand, this decrease in aggregate demand must in turn be combated by a decrease in real prices. They state that within contemporary monetary policy, central banks can combat this shock by lowering either the nominal exchange rate or nominal prices. However, the presence of a currency pegging regime rules out devaluations of the nominal exchange rate, therefore central banks must resort to a devaluation of nominal prices. Economies that face downward rigidity on prices however, will experience less effectiveness from monetary policy, with real devaluation taking place slowly. They conclude that economies following a currency pegging system will face between 1.3 and 7.1% higher unemployment, and between 0.4%-4.8% lower consumption than an economy that follows a free-floating exchange rate regime.

Selected awards

 Honorary Professor, Henan University, Kaifeng, China, 2018-
 National Science Foundation Grant, with Martín Uribe, 2011-2013
 Bernacer Prize, 2004
 Alfred P. Sloan Doctoral Dissertation Fellowship, 1993
 University of Chicago Fellowships, 1989–92
 Fulbright Fellowship, 1987-1988

Published works

Economics textbooks

Selected academic articles

References

Living people
German economists
Year of birth missing (living people)
Columbia University faculty
University of Münster alumni
Baruch College alumni
University of Chicago alumni
Duke University faculty
Rutgers University faculty